Leslie Harris is the president and chief executive officer of the Center for Democracy and Technology (CDT) in Washington, D.C. in the United States. Harris joined CDT in 2005 as executive director. She manages the organization and serves its chief spokesperson, and has occasionally testified before Congress.

CDT prepared a detailed Internet policy document for the Obama administration and Harris said she felt the administration had listened.

She founded Leslie Harris & Associates, and has worked for People for the American Way and the American Civil Liberties Union. She holds a law degree from Georgetown University Law Center and a bachelor's degree from the University of North Carolina.

References

External links

Georgetown University Law Center alumni
University of North Carolina at Chapel Hill alumni
American women chief executives
Year of birth missing (living people)
Living people
American women lawyers
American lawyers
American technology chief executives
American nonprofit chief executives
21st-century American women lawyers
21st-century American lawyers